Corner Houses are a type of building located at the junction of two or three roads.

Hong Kong 

Corner houses are buildings located at junctions. In Hong Kong, buildings must meet certain specifications, which is why corner houses are so common on Hong Kong Island and Kowloon.

Corner houses originate from the Composite Buildings of Hong Kong. They were popularized in the 1950s and the 1960s. Most corner houses are fourth-generation tong lau, featuring rounded corners and lines.

Antonio Hermenegildo Basto currently holds the record for the most corner buildings designed in Hong Kong.

Locations 

Hong Kong Island: Wan Chai, Causeway Bay, Sai Ying Pun, Shau Kei Wan

Kowloon: Sham Shui Po, Mong Kok, Tai Kok Tsui, To Kwa Wan, Cheung Sha Wan

Styles 
Hanging signs in large facades.
Units in round corners are known as large units.
 Round buildings are built in a Bauhaus style.

Types

Notable buildings

Hong Kong 
14 Nam Cheong Street (Boundary Street and Nam Cheong Street)
May Wah Building (Wan Chai Road and Johnston Road
Mido Cafe (Temple Street and Public Square Street
New Lucky House (Nathan Road and Jordan Road)
Chung Wui Mansion (Wan Chai Road, Fleming Road, and Johnston Road)
Hing Wah Mansion (Babington Path, Park Road, St Stephen's Lane, and Oaklands Path)

Taiwan 
Hayashi Department Store

United States 
Flatiron Building (NYC)

UK 
The Cornerhouse, Nottingham
Cornerhouse (Demolished)

See also 
Tong lau
Composite Building

References

Further reading

External links 
Piece of Hong Kong's History: Composite Buildings》 

Buildings and structures by type